Mendlesham railway station was a station on the Mid-Suffolk Light Railway.

History
Mendlesham railway station was in the village of Mendlesham, Suffolk. It was from Haughley to Laxfield. The station was opened in 1908 and closed in 1952.

The Station was four miles from Haughley and was made up of a 130 ft platform with the standard MSLR corrugated iron clad station building with an open waiting room with an ornate fronted canopy with a booking office on the left side and a store room on the other side. This building makes up part of the Mid-Suffolk Light Railway Society collection.

External links
 Mendlesham station on 1946 O. S. map

References 

Comfort, N. A. (1986) The Mid-Suffolk Light Railway, The Oakwood Press. 
Paye, P. (1986) The Mid-Suffolk Light Railway, Wild Swan Publications Ltd. 

Disused railway stations in Suffolk
Former Mid-Suffolk Light Railway stations
Railway stations in Great Britain opened in 1908
Railway stations in Great Britain closed in 1952
1908 establishments in England